Otman Bakkal (born 27 February 1985) is a Dutch retired international footballer who played as an attacking midfielder.

He began his career at PSV, and was loaned to Den Bosch, Eindhoven, Twente and Feyenoord. After making a permanent move to Dynamo Moscow in the summer of 2012, he returned to Feyenoord one year later.

Club career

Otman Bakkal made his senior debut for PSV during the 2003–04 season in a 3–0 win over Auxerre. Three days later, on 28 March 2004, he made his league debut and the first senior start of his career in a 3–1 loss against Willem II. He signed a new three-year deal with PSV in May of that year.

Over the next three seasons, Bakkal would not get any playing time at PSV. Instead, he was loaned out to FC Den Bosch, FC Eindhoven and FC Twente.

Following the 2006–07 season, Bakkal re-joined PSV and saw regular first-team action. In November 2010, he was bitten in the shoulder by Luis Suárez during a 0–0 draw against Ajax. That incident caused Suárez to be suspended for seven games.

During the 2010–11 season, Bakkal was loaned to Feyenoord, having lost any expectation of regular playing time with PSV. He displayed impressive form and drew the interest of Premier League side Swansea City. Instead, he joined Russian club Dynamo Moscow for the 2012–13 season.

A year after leaving Holland for Russia, Bakkal returned to the Eredivisie to sign for former loan club Feyenoord, signing a one-year contract running until 30 June 2014. At the end of the 2013–14 season, his contract was subsequently allowed to expire.

In March 2016 Bakkal announced he was not looking for a new club anymore after two years as a free agent.

International career
Bakkal played at the 2007 UEFA European Under-21 Football Championship and the 2008 Summer Olympics. He made his debut for the senior national side in 2009, after coming on as a substitute for Rafael van der Vaart in a friendly match against Paraguay. He played the final six minutes of the game, and it would remain his only cap, giving him the shortest career in the Netherlands national team ever.

Personal life
Bakkal is of Moroccan descent.

References

External links
 Voetbal International profile 
 Holland stats at OnsOranje

1985 births
Living people
Footballers from Eindhoven
Dutch sportspeople of Moroccan descent
Association football midfielders
Dutch footballers
PSV Eindhoven players
FC Den Bosch players
FC Eindhoven players
FC Twente players
Feyenoord players
FC Dynamo Moscow players
Eredivisie players
Eerste Divisie players
Russian Premier League players
Footballers at the 2008 Summer Olympics
Olympic footballers of the Netherlands
Netherlands international footballers
Netherlands under-21 international footballers
Dutch expatriate footballers
Expatriate footballers in Russia
Dutch expatriate sportspeople in Russia